Talamancaster is a genus of flowering plants belonging to the family Asteraceae.

Its native range is Central America, Northwestern Venezuela.

Species:

Talamancaster andinus 
Talamancaster cuchumatanicus 
Talamancaster minusculus 
Talamancaster panamensis 
Talamancaster sakiranus 
Talamancaster westonii

References

Astereae
Asteraceae genera